Anbu Engey is a 1958 Indian Tamil-language drama film, directed by D. Yoganand and produced by V. Govindarajan. Its story and dialogue were written by Murasoli Maran, and screenplay by Rajendra. The film stars S. S. Rajendran, K. Balaji, Pandari Bai and S. V. Ranga Rao, with Devika, T. R. Ramachandran, Manorama and Mynavathi in supporting roles. It was released on 12 December 1958.

Plot 

The story revolves around a rich man Masilamani Mudaliar who has two sons Ramu and Somu, and a daughter Kamu. Masilamani is a gambler, the elder son Ramu is a womaniser and alcoholic. He, however, ends up marrying a traditional woman Amudha, who takes it upon herself to reform the family. Parvathi, the family maid takes care of the younger son Somu and the two get married, with the blessings of the family.

Cast 
 S. S. Rajendran as Somu
 K. Balaji as Ramu
 Pandari Bai as Amudha, Ramu's wife
 S. V. Ranga Rao as Masilamani Mudaliar
 Devika as Parvathi
 T. R. Ramachandran as Appavu
 Mynavathi as Kamu
 Manorama in guest appearance
 V. S. Raghavan in guest appearance
 S. A. Ashokan in guest appearance
 Suriyakala as Mala
 Lakshmi Prabha as Alamelu
 S. D. Subbulakshmi as Amudha's mother

Soundtrack 
The music was composed by Vedha, with lyrics written by Pattukkottai Kalyanasundaram, Kannadasan, Thanjai N. Ramaiah Dass, Vindhan and V. Seetharaman.

The two songs Melay Parakkum Rockettu and Dingiri Dingale (the songs with Baila music, which in turn was influenced by Portuguese music) topped the charts. The song Dingiri Dingale (Meenachi) was covered in Sinhala as Pissu Vikare (Dagena Polkatu Male) by H. R. Jothipala, Milton Perera, M. S. Fernando. And it was covered again in Sinhala as a folk song named Digisi/Digiri Digare (Kussiye Badu). The song Dingiri Dingale was recreated by Sulaiman Kakkodan for the 2021 Malayalam film Kurup.

Pedda Kodalu (Telugu) songs
The music was composed by M. Ranga Rao. Lyrics were by Narapa Reddy. Playback singers are P. B. Sreenivas, Mrutyumjaya Reddy, K. Jamuna Rani, P. Susheela, R. Balasaraswathi Devi, K. Rani and S. Janaki.

All the tunes for all the songs for both languages are the same.

References

External links 
 

1950s Tamil-language films
1958 drama films
1958 films
Films directed by D. Yoganand
Indian black-and-white films
Indian drama films
Films scored by Vedha (composer)